"Fíjate Bien" (English: "Focus") is a song written and performed by Colombian singer-songwriter Juanes. The song is the title track and first radio single from his debut solo studio album, Fíjate Bien.

This track won the Latin Grammy Award for Best Rock Song at the Latin Grammy Awards of 2001.

Track listing
"Fíjate Bien" (Radio Edit) – 
"Fíjate Bien" (Album Version) – 4:54

Juanes songs
Songs written by Juanes
Latin Grammy Award for Best Rock Song
Song recordings produced by Gustavo Santaolalla
2000 debut singles
Universal Music Latino singles
Spanish-language songs
2000 songs